Nigel is an English masculine given name. 

The English Nigel is commonly found in records dating from the Middle Ages; however, it was not used much before being revived by 19th-century antiquarians. For instance, Walter Scott published The Fortunes of Nigel in 1822, and Arthur Conan Doyle published Sir Nigel in 1905–06. As a name given for boys in England and Wales, it peaked in popularity from the 1950s to the 1970s (see below).

Nigel has never been as common in other countries as it is in Britain, but was among the 1,000 most common names for boys born in the United States from 1971 to 2010. Numbers peaked in 1994 when 447 were recorded (it was the 478th most common boys' name that year). The peak popularity at 0.02% of boys' names in 1994 compares to a peak popularity in England and Wales of about 1.2% in 1963, 60 times higher.

Etymology
The name is derived from the church Latin . However, this is now considered an example of an incorrect etymology created by French-speaking clerics, who knew Latin as well, to translate the Norman first name Neel in the Latin written documents. The Latin word  gave birth to Old French  (modern ), meaning “niello, black enamel” and it explains the confusion, because the clerics believed it was the same etymology as the first name Neel, spelled the same way.

Ultimately Nigel, via medieval Latin Nigellus and subsequently Norman Neel (modern surname Néel), is derived from the Norse Njáll. The Norse Njáll, in turn, is derived from the Gaelic given name Niall.

England and Wales
The following table shows the number of boys given the first name Nigel in specific years in England and Wales. Numbers peaked in about 1963. In 1964 it was the 23rd most popular boys' name. By 2016 the number of boys named Nigel had dropped below 3, the minimum number reported by the ONS.

Medieval figures
  (Néel de Saint-Sauveur), Norman baron at Saint-Sauveur-le-Vicomte in Cotentin
 Nigel D'Oyly (Néel d'Ouilly), Anglo-Norman lord
 Nigel d'Aubigny (Néel d'Aubigny), Norman nobleman
 Nigel (bishop of Ely) (Néel d'Ely), Anglo-Norman bishop
 Nigel de Longchamps, 12th-century English poet

Notable people named Nigel
Nigel Ah Wong (born 1990), New Zealand rugby player
Nigel Ayers (born 1957), English multimedia artist
Nigel Barker (photographer) (born 1972), English fashion photographer
Nigel Benn (born 1964), British boxer
Nigel Bennett (born 1949), Anglo-Canadian actor, director, and writer
Nigel Benson (born 1955), British writer and illustrator
Nigel Blackwell, English lead singer and guitarist of Half Man Half Biscuit
Nigel Bond (born 1965), British snooker player
Nigel Bonner (1928-1994), British zoologist and Antarctic marine mammal specialist
Nigel Bruce (1895–1953), British actor
Nigel Clough (born 1966), British footballer
Nigel Cullen (1917–1941), Australian fighter ace of World War II
Nigel Cumberland, British author
Nigel Dakin (born 1964), Soldier, Diplomat and Governor of the Turks and Caicos Islands
Nigel Davenport (1928–2013), English actor
Nigel Dick (born 1953), English director, writer, and musician
Nigel Dodds (born 1958), British/Northern Irish politician, MP (DUP)
Nigel Edwards (disambiguation)
Nigel Evans (born 1957), British politician
Nigel Farage (born 1964), British politician, MEP (Brexit Party)
Nigel Fountain (born 1944), British writer, journalist, editor and broadcaster
Nigel Glockler (born 1953), English drummer of the heavy metal band Saxon
Nigel Godrich (born 1971), English recording engineer and record producer
Nigel Green (1924–1972), British actor
Nigel Gresley (1876–1941), British steam locomotive engineer
Nigel Harris (disambiguation), multiple people
Nigel Harte, Westmeath Gaelic footballer
Nigel Havers (born 1951), English actor
Nigel Hawthorne (1929–2001), English actor
Nigel Hayes (born 1994), American basketball player
Nigel Haywood (born 1955), Governor of the Falkland Islands
Nigel Hess (born 1953), British composer
Nigel Horspool, British-born inventor of the Boyer–Moore–Horspool algorithm
Nigel Holmes (born 1942), British graphic designer
Nigel Irens, British yacht designer
Nigel de Jong (born 1984), Dutch footballer
Nigel Keay (born 1955), New Zealand violist and composer
Nigel Kennedy (born 1956), British violinist and violist
Nigel Kneale (1922–2006), British scriptwriter
Nigel Latta (born 1967), New Zealand psychologist
Nigel Lawson (born 1932), British politician, Chancellor of the Exchequer
Nigel Lythgoe (born 1949), English television, film director and producer
Nigel Mansell (born 1953), British racing car driver
Nigel Martyn (born 1966), British football goalkeeper
Nigel Marven (born 1960), British wildlife television presenter/producer, author, and hobby ornithologist
Nigel McGuinness (born 1976), British wrestler
Nigel Melville (born 1961), English rugby player, coach, and administrator
Nigel Miguel (born 1963), Belizean-American actor, film producer, film commissioner, basketball player
Nigel Mitchell, British television presenter and radio presenter
Nigel Morris (born 1958), British businessman and co-founder of Capital One
Nigel Murch (1944–2020), Australian cricketer
Nigel Ng (born 1991), Malaysian stand-up comedian
Nigel Northridge (born 1956), British businessman
Nigel Oakes (born 1962), British businessman
Nigel Olsson (born 1949), drummer for Elton John, solo recording artist
Nigel Owens (born 1971), Welsh rugby referee
Nigel Pivaro (born 1959), English actor, he played as Terry Duckworth in Coronation Street
Nigel Planer (born 1953), English actor
Nigel Plum, Australian rugby player
Nigel Poor, American podcaster
Nigel Reo-Coker (born 1984), English footballer
Nigel Richards (born 1967), five times World Scrabble Champion
Nigel Rodgers (born 1952), British author
Nigel Roberts, British computer scientist
Nigel Short (born 1965), English chess player
Nigel Slater (born 1958), English food writer and broadcaster
Nigel Smart (born 1969), Australian footballer
Nigel Stock (actor) (1919–1986), English actor who played Dr Watson
Nigel John Taylor (born 1960), bass player of Duran Duran
Nigel Vardy, British mountaineer
Nigel Warburton, British philosopher
Nigel Watson (1947–2019), British blues-rock guitarist
Nigel Williams-Goss (born 1994), American basketball player
Nigel Winterburn (born 1963), English footballer
Nigel Worthington (born 1961), Northern Irish footballer and manager

Fictional characters 
 Good Dog Nigel, the titular character in a poem from John Lennon's 1964 book In His Own Write.
 Nigel, a character in 1989 American independent coming of age comedy movie She's Out of Control
 Nigel Bathgate, a journalist, in the detective novel, A Man Lay Dead (1934) by Dame Ngaio Marsh
 Nigel Bottom, a poet and playwright in Something Rotten!
 Nigel Cronin, a character from 1991 black comedy movie Drop Dead Fred
 Nigel Olifaunt, Lord Glenvarloch, main character of Sir Walter Scott's novel The Fortunes of Nigel
 Sir Nigel (Loring), a novel by Arthur Conan Doyle based on the life of Neil Loring
 Nigel Pargetter, a character on the BBC radio soap opera The Archers
 Nigel Baker, a character in Cheaper by the Dozen and its sequel
 Nigel Forrester, a character from Bratz Rock Angelz with whom Cloe falls in love
 "Making Plans for Nigel", 1979 New Wave hit for English group XTC
 Nigel Powers (played by actor Michael Caine) is a character who appears in the third Austin Powers movie, Austin Powers in Goldmember, as the father of Austin Powers and Dr. Evil
 Principal Nigel Brown, a character on The Amazing World of Gumball
 Nigel Molesworth, schoolboy in 1950s humour books by Geoffrey Willans and Ronald Searle
 Nigel Moon, one of the many brothers of the character Daphne Moon in the TV series Frasier
 Nigel, a brown pelican and character in the 2003 Disney/Pixar animated film Finding Nemo
 Nigel, a British koala in 2006 Disney animated film The Wild
 Nigel, the gangster ex-husband in Fredrik Bond's Charlie Countryman
 Nigel "Nidge" Delaney, fictional character played by Tom Vaughan-Lawlor in RTE crime drama TV series Love/Hate
 Sir Nigel Irvine, SIS chief in Frederick Forsyth's spy fiction The Fourth Protocol
 Nigel, a sadistic sulphur-crested cockatoo who is the main antagonist in the Rio franchise
 Nigel Burke, the main character in Surgeon Simulator 2013
 Nigel, nickname given by the community to the British pilot model in War Thunder Nigel Bumble, a fictional character who join The Rooks in Assassin's Creed Syndicate
 Nigel, an agoraphobic sheep dog in the New Zealand film The Price of Milk (2000)
 Nigel, played by Hugh Grant, in the movie Bitter Moon (1992)
 Sir Nigel Thornberry, fictional wildlife documentary producer from The Wild Thornberrys
 Nigel Tufnel, lead guitarist for the fictional band Spinal Tap
 Nigel Ratburn, an anthropomorphic rat and elementary school teacher,  in the Arthur TV series
 Nigel Planter, a character from The Grim Adventures of Billy & Mandy
 Nigel Uno, a fictional character from Codename: Kids Next Door
 Nigel Wolpert, a Gryffindor wizard from Harry Potter

Dog
 Nigel, a Golden Retriever dog that belonged to Monty Don, a British television gardening presenter.

References 

Given names
English given names
English masculine given names
Slang 
Pejorative terms for European people